Hamadryas is a genus of flowering, perennial herbs in the family Ranunculaceae. It is found in the southernmost regions of Chile and Argentina, as well as the Falkland Islands, predominantly in alpine and sub-alpine habitats. The range of one species, Hamadryas delfinii, extends north into San Juan Province, Argentina.

The five identified species are
 Hamadryas argentea
Hamadryas delfinii
Hamadryas kingii
Hamadryas magellanica
Hamadryas sempervivoides

References 

Ranunculaceae
Ranunculaceae genera